Nikola Zdráhalová (born 1 April 1996) is a Czech speed skater. She competed in the women's 3000 metres at the 2018 Winter Olympics.

References

External links
 

1996 births
Living people
People from Dvůr Králové nad Labem
Czech female speed skaters
Olympic speed skaters of the Czech Republic
Speed skaters at the 2012 Winter Youth Olympics
Speed skaters at the 2018 Winter Olympics
Speed skaters at the 2022 Winter Olympics
Sportspeople from the Hradec Králové Region